Leptinella squalida is a species of flowering plant in the daisy family, native to New Zealand.

A cultivar with almost black foliage, L. squalida 'Platt's Black', is grown as an ornamental plant, particularly in rock gardens and in flowering lawns.

References

Anthemideae
Flora of New Zealand